Inningen station is a train station in the Augsburg district Inningen, located in Swabia, Bavaria, Germany. It is served by  DB Regio Bayern and Bayerische Regiobahn. AVV Bus service is available at the nearby Inningen Ost bus stop. In the 1960s, the station, now mainly used by commuters on local services, was converted into a stop with an alternate siding, the loading track of which was used until the 1990s for loading agricultural products such as sugar beets and for fuel. Today, the station consists of an unoccupied reception building and two outside platforms accessible via a pedestrian underpass.

Services
 the following services stop at Bobingen:

References 

Railway stations in Augsburg